Phoenix Peak is a  mountain summit in the La Garita Mountains of the U.S. State of Colorado. The mountain in Rio Grande National Forest straddles the border between Mineral County and the La Garita Wilderness in Saguache County. Phoenix Peak is the highest point in Mineral County, Colorado.


Mountain
"Phoenix Peak" is the proposed name for this second highest officially unnamed summit in Colorado. The summit has also been called "Gwynedd Mountain" and "Creede Crest".

See also

Colorado
Geography of Colorado
List of mountain peaks of Colorado
:Category:Mountains of Colorado

References

External links

Colorado state government website
Mineral County, Colorado government website
Saguache County, Colorado government website
Phoenix Peak at 14ers.com
Phoenix Peak at climb13ers.com
Phoenix Peak at summitpost.org

Mountains of Colorado